Jonathan Ogden (born 1974) is an American football player.

Jonathan Ogden may also refer to:

Jonathan Ogden (singer), founder and lead singer of English Christian band Rivers & Robots
Jonathan Ogden (surgeon) (died 1803), Canadian surgeon and chief justice of Newfoundland
Jonathan Ogden Armour (1863–1927), American meatpacking magnate
Jonathan Ogden Moseley (1762–1838), American politician, member of the U.S. House of Representatives from Connecticut